Kulamavu Dam is a gravity/masonry dam on Kilivillithode which is a tributary of the  Periyar river in Arakkulam village, Idukki district of Kerala, India . It is one of the three dams associated with the Idukki hydro electric power project in the Indian state of Kerala. This dam is located towards the western side of the Idukki Arch Dam.  This is a gravity dam with the top portion in concrete and the bottom in masonry.

The dam was completed in the year 1977 and is operated and maintained by Kerala State Electricity Board.

The dams of Idukki, Cheruthoni and Kulamavu extend to an area of 33 km2.  The construction of these three dams formed a 60 km2 artificial lake.  The water stored in it is used for the production of electricity at the power house in Moolamattom. Taluks through which release flow are
Thodupuzha, Udupanchola, Devikulam, Kothamangalam, Muvattupuzha, Kunnathunadu, Aluva, Kodungalloor and Paravur.

Specifications

Type of Dam :Masonry & Concrete Gravity
Classification : VH (Very High Dam )
Panchayath : Arakkulam
 Village : idukki
District : Idukki
River Basin : Periyar
River : Kilivallithodu
Release from Dam to river : Kilivallithodu
 Length of Dam (m) : 385
Max Height above Foundation (m) :100
Total Volume Content of Dam (TCM) :453.13
Gross storage capacity: 1.996 cubic Kms (70.50 tmc ft)
Active storage capacity: 1.46 cubic kms (51.56 tmc ft)
Design Flood (cumec) :8014 
Maximum Water Level (MWL) : EL 2408.50 ft. ( 734.30 m)
Full Reservoir Level ( FRL) : EL 2403.00 ft. ( 732.62 m)
Storage at FRL : 1996.30Mm3
Spillway : No spillway

[
{
  "type": "Feature",
  "geometry": { "type": "Point", "coordinates": [77.144167,9.528611, ] },
  "properties": {
    "title": "Mullaperiyar Dam",
   "description": "",
    "marker-symbol": "dam",
    "marker-size": "large",
    "marker-color": "0050d0"
  }
},
{
  "type": "Feature",
  "geometry": { "type": "Point", "coordinates": [76.976111,9.842778 ] },
  "properties": {
    "title": "Idukki Dam",
    "description": "",
    "marker-symbol": "dam",
    "marker-size": "large",
    "marker-color": "0050d0"
  }
},
{
  "type": "Feature",
  "geometry": { "type": "Point", "coordinates": [76.966944,9.845278] },
  "properties": {
    "title": "Cheruthoni Dam",
   "description": "",
    "marker-symbol": "dam",
    "marker-size": "large",
    "marker-color": "0050d0"
  }
},
{
  "type": "Feature",
  "geometry": { "type": "Point", "coordinates": [76.896111,9.802942] },
  "properties": {
    "title": "Kulamavu Dam",
   "description": "",
    "marker-symbol": "dam",
    "marker-size": "large",
    "marker-color": "0050d0"
  }
},
{
  "type": "Feature",
  "geometry": { "type": "Point", "coordinates": [ 77.124,10.106] },
  "properties": {
    "title": "Mattupetty Dam",
   "description": "",
    "marker-symbol": "dam",
    "marker-size": "large",
    "marker-color": "0050d0"
  }
},
{
  "type": "Feature",
  "geometry": { "type": "Point", "coordinates": [76.9548034,9.962278] },
  "properties": {
    "title": "Lower Periyar Dam",
    "marker-symbol": "dam",
    "marker-size": "large",
    "marker-color": "0050d0"
  }
},
{
  "type": "Feature",
  "geometry": { "type": "Point", "coordinates": [76.9968439,9.9829676] },
  "properties": {
    "title": "Kallarkutty Dam",
    "description": "",
    "marker-symbol": "dam",
    "marker-size": "large",
    "marker-color": "0050d0"
  }
},
{
  "type": "Feature",
  "geometry": { "type": "Point", "coordinates": [76.705833,10.221667] },
  "properties": {
    "title": "Idamalayar Dam",
   "description": "",
    "marker-symbol": "dam",
    "marker-size": "large",
    "marker-color": "0050d0"
  }
},
{
  "type": "Feature",
  "geometry": { "type": "Point", "coordinates": [77.1763,10.0218] },
  "properties": {
    "title": "Anayirankal Dam",
   "description": "",
    "marker-symbol": "dam",
    "marker-size": "large",
    "marker-color": "0050d0"
  }
},
{
  "type": "Feature",
  "geometry": { "type": "Point", "coordinates": [77.19,10.14] },
  "properties": {
    "title": "Kundala Dam",
   "description": "",
    "marker-symbol": "dam",
    "marker-size": "large",
    "marker-color": "0050d0"
  }
},
{
  "type": "Feature",
  "geometry": { "type": "Point", "coordinates": [76.662222,10.136389] },
  "properties": {
    "title": "Bhoothathankettu",
   "description": "",
    "marker-symbol": "dam",
    "marker-size": "large",
    "marker-color": "0050d0"
  }
}

]

Resesrvoir

Hydroelectric project

This Underground Power Station is supposedly a technological achievement. There are six generating units each of 130 MW capacity. There are seven 220KV feeders for transmitting the power to the load centers. The power generated in the powerhouse is taken to the switchyard through 220 KV oil filled cables. After power generation, water from the power station is released to the Thodupuzha River through an underground tunnel which is 1220 meters in length. This tail race water is in turn used for producing electricity in the Malankara Small Hydro Electric Station and also for irrigation by means of Irrigation dam at Malankara.

See also
 Cheruthoni Dam
 Idukki Dam
 List of reservoirs and dams in India
 Moolamattom Power Station
 Telefilm about Idukki Dam

References

External links
 Kulamavu(Eb) Dam data

Dams in Idukki district
Dams completed in 1977
1977 establishments in Kerala
20th-century architecture in India